This is a list of key Jewish-Canadian authors, with an article and critical history to follow.

A
 Irving Abella (historian)
 Barbara Amiel (journalist)
 Lisa Appignanesi (journalist and novelist)
 Margaret Atwood (poetess)

B
 Ben Barry (entrepreneur and author)
 Saul Bellow (Canadian-born American novelist)
 David Bezmozgis (novelist and short story writer)

C
 Leonard Cohen (poet, novelist, songwriter)
 Matt Cohen (novelist)
 Michael Coren (journalist and biographer)

D
 Cory Doctorow (science fiction writer)

E
 Rebecca Eckler (journalist)

F
 Ken Finkleman (screenwriter)
 Diane Flacks (playwright)
 Martin Friedland (law writer)
 David Frum (journalist)
 Linda Frum (journalist)

G
 Gabriella Goliger (novelist)
 Noam Gonick (screenwriter)
Nora Gold (author, activist)

H
 Charles Yale Harrison (novelist, biographer)
 Anna Heilman (memoirist)
 Simma Holt (journalist and politician)
 Mel Hurtig (journalist and publisher)
 Zach Hyman (children's author)

J
 Jane Jacobs (philosopher, political theorist)
 George Jonas (journalist, poet and playwright)

K
 Naïm Kattan (novelist and essayist)
 A.M. Klein (poet, novelist, essayist)
 Naomi Klein (journalist)
 Rachel Korn (poet)
 Henry Kreisel (novelist)
 Aaron Kreuter (poet)

L
 Michele Landsberg (journalist)
 Irving Layton (poet)
 Allan Levine (novelist)
 Norman Levine (short story writer)
 Dahlia Lithwick (journalist and editor)

M
 Eli Mandel (poet)
 Stephen Marche (novelist)
 Michael Marrus (historian)
 Seymour Mayne (poet)
 Anne Michaels (poet, novelist)
 Hannah Moscovitch (playwright)

N
 Jay Newman (philosopher and academic)
 M. J. Nurenberger (journalist)

R
 David Rakoff (humorist)
 Edeet Ravel (novelist)
 Judy Rebick (journalist)
 Abraham Rhinewine (journalist)
 Mordecai Richler (novelist, essayist)
 Nancy Richler (novelist)
 Ellen Roseman (journalist, essayist, author)
 Chava Rosenfarb (novelist, poet, playwright)
 Stuart Ross (poet, short story writer, essayist)

S
 Jason Sherman (playwright)
 Joseph Sherman (poet)
 Kenneth Sherman (poet)

T
 Ellie Tesher (journalist)
 Aren X. Tulchinsky (novelist)

W
 Michael Wex (novelist and playwright)
 Adele Wiseman (novelist)

Z
 Larry Zolf (journalist)
 Rachel Zolf (poet)

References

Lists of Canadian writers